Vanessa Jackson  (born 6 June 1953; Peaslake, Surrey) is a British painter, notable for her wall installation paintings. She was elected to the Royal Academy of Arts in 2015.

Education and career 
Jackson studied at Saint Martin's School of Art, where she received a B.A. first class honours in 1975, and the Royal College of Art, where she received an MA in 1978.

In 1985 and 1990, she undertook the Yaddo Residency in to New York. Jackson has an extensive career teaching fine art. She was Head of Painting at Winchester School of Art from 1988 to 1997, MA and research tutor at the Royal College of Art, and senior tutor at the Royal Academy Schools from 1998 to 2013. She is currently a member of the fine art faculty at the British School at Rome and is the Chair of the Edwin Austin Abbey Council, which provides awards for painters.

In 1998-9, Jackson was included in the South Bank Centre's exhibition The Presence of Painting. Her oil on canvas painting So Much Depends was a prizewinner at John Moores Liverpool Exhibition 1993-4.

Jackson was elected to the Royal Academy of Arts on 2 September 2015.

Exhibitions

Solo exhibitions 
 1978 Cottesloe Auditorium, National Theatre, London
 1981 AIR Gallery, London
 1984 Vortex Gallery, London
 1986 Gotham Book-Mart Gallery, New York
 1990 The Winchester Gallery, Winchester
 1992 Goodsway Gallery (Cubitt), London
 1994 The Eagle Gallery, London
 1999 North House Gallery, Manningtree
 2002 InsideSpace Gallery, London
 2003 Art Inc, Chelsea, New York
 2005 Keith Talent Gallery, London
 2005 Studio1.1.Gallery, London
 2006 Short Circuit since '79, survey show, Poussin Gallery, London
 2010 Throwing Shapes, Wall Painting, CPG Café Gallery Southwark Park
 2008 Vertigo in Three Parts, Wall Painting, Sadler's Wells Theatre, London
 2012 Studio 1.1 Gallery. 30 Day OlympiAINT
 2013 North House Gallery, Paintings and Prints, Manningtree
 2014 Rough Cut and Faceted, Marcelle Joseph Projects 
 2017 A Light Here, Tintype Gallery

Two-person exhibitions 
 1986 Castlefield Gallery, Manchester, with Hamish McLennan
 1997 Harriet Green Gallery, London, with John Crossley
 2004 Tunnel Gallery, Tonbridge, with John Dougill

Group exhibitions (selected, starting in 2010) 
 2010 "Throwing Shapes" curated by Rebecca Geldard, Coleman Gallery, London
 2010 The Royal Academy Summer Show, The Royal Academy of Art, London
 2011 Zig Zag curated by Katrina Blannin, Charlie Dutton Gallery
 2011 The Royal Academy Summer Show, The Royal Academy of Art, London
 2012 Ha Ha What Does This Represent, Standpoint Gallery, curated by Katrina Blannin and Francesca Simon, catalogue with essay by David Ryan
 2012 The Royal Academy Summer Show, The Royal Academy of Art, London
 2013 2Q13, Women Artists, Women Collectors, Lloyds Club, curated by Marcelle Joseph Projects
 2013 The Perfect Death/Horizons, Lion and Lamb Gallery, organised by Phill Allen and VJ
 2013 AMERIKA, What America means to non Americans, Camberwell Space, curated by Alasdair Duncan
 2013 "Even Clouds..." Studio 1.1
 2013 The Royal Academy Summer Show, The Royal Academy of Art, London
 2014 Abstract Geometry, Rook & Raven Gallery, with Vanessa Hodgkinson and Rupert Newman
 2014 The Royal Academy Summer Show, The Royal Academy of Art, London
 2015 Infero, at Lloyds Club
 2015 Distressed Geometry, Baden Kunstraum/Zurich, Switzerland
 2015 O-N-T-O-L-O-G-Y ARTHOUSE1, London with Celia Cook and Brandon Taylor (with Sonia Delauney and Sol Le Witt)
 2015 Royal Academy Summer Show 2015, invited by Michael Craig-Martin, Royal Academy of Arts, London
 2015 - 2016 Simply Painting, Inverness Museum & Art Gallery, curated by Jim Mooney (touring to Thurso Art Gallery & The Peacock Arts Centre, Aberdeen)
 2016 Spore curated by Tom Owen and Grant Foster, Kennington Residency
 2016 Royal Academy Summer Exhibition
 2017 Women Artists in Conversation - with Gluck, Fine Art Society
 2017 Surface Cutting curated by Eillen Cooper, Royal Academy of Arts

Personal life 
Jackson's husband was the painter, John Dougill (1934 - 2015).

References

External links
 
 Two paintings by Vanessa Jackson in the New Hall Art Collection, Cambridge

1953 births
British women artists
Living people
Royal Academicians
Alumni of Saint Martin's School of Art
Alumni of the Royal College of Art